Aodhagan Bernard O'Neill (born 28 October 1959) is an Irish former professional darts player who played in events of the Professional Darts Corporation (PDC).

Career

O'Neill won the 2009 Tom Kirby Memorial Irish Matchplay beating Jason Cullen, Benny Grace and William O'Connor, earning him a place in the 2010 PDC World Darts Championship. He later reached the quarter-finals of the Gleneagle Irish Masters, beating Terry Jenkins, Nick Fullwell, and Andy Jenkins before losing 5-2 to Brendan Dolan.

O'Neill defeated South Africa's Les Francis in the preliminary round, but lost 3-0 to Adrian Lewis in the first round.

He quit the PDC in 2012.

Personal life

O'Neill makes his living as a chef in the Irish Army.

World Championship results

PDC
 2010: 1st Round (lost to Adrian Lewis 0-3) (sets)

External links
Profile and stats on Darts Database

Irish darts players
1959 births
Living people
British Darts Organisation players
Irish Army soldiers
Professional Darts Corporation former tour card holders